Retimohnia acadiana is a species of sea snail, a marine gastropod mollusk in the family Retimohniidae, the true whelks and the like.

Description

Distribution

References

 Garcia E.F. (2008). Four new buccinid species (Gastropoda: Buccinidae) from the western Atlantic. Novapex 9(4): 141-148

External links

Retimohniidae
Gastropods described in 2008